Senator Shields may refer to:

Members of the United States Senate
James Shields (politician, born 1806) (1806–1879), U.S. Senator from Illinois from 1849 to 1855; from Minnesota from 1858 to 1859; and from Missouri in 1879
John K. Shields (1858–1934), U.S. Senator from Tennessee from 1913 to 1925

United States state senate members
Charles W. Shields (born 1959), Missouri State Senate
Frank Shields (politician) (born 1945), Oregon State Senate